Arnau Brugués Davi (born 5 March 1985, in Spain) is a retired professional tennis player from Spain.

He graduated from the University of Tulsa in 2009. A four-time All-American and four-time Conference USA player of the year. Won the 2006 Polo Ralph Lauren All-American Tennis Championship, marking the first national championship won by a Tulsa tennis player or a Conference USA tennis athlete, he defeated John Isner in the finals 7/6 6/4. He was ranked as high as No. 1 in singles and No. 3 in doubles. Inducted into the Conference USA hall of fame in July 2019.

He won seventeen ITF Futures tournaments on hard courts in his career, however his best achievements are singles and doubles titles in 2011 Penza Cup (ATP Challenger Tour). Then he defeated Mikhail Kukushkin and Sergei Bubka / Adrián Menéndez in the finals.
In May 2012 he set a new record in ITF Pro Circuit action for most consecutive singles main draw victories, a total of 44 wins in a row. With the victory in the final of the Turkey F17 tournament held in Antalya-Belconti, Brugués moved onto 40 match wins, surpassing Eduardo Schwank's record of 39 wins.

ATP Challenger and ITF Futures Finals

Singles: 23 (17–6)

Doubles: 8 (5–3)

Performance timeline

Singles

References

External links

University of Tulsa Profile

Living people
1985 births
Spanish male tennis players
Tennis players from Catalonia